The planalto hermit (Phaethornis pretrei) is a species of bird in the family Trochilidae, the hummingbirds. It is found in Argentina, Bolivia, Brazil, Paraguay, and Peru.

Taxonomy and systematics

At one time, the planalto hermit was suggested to belong to a monotypic genus Anisoterus but this treatment was quickly rejected. It is closely related to the sooty-capped hermit (P. augusti) and may form a superspecies with it. It has no recognized subspecies, but several that have been proposed have been shown to be based on aberrant specimens or individual variation.

Description

Males weigh  and females . This medium-sized hermit has mostly olive green upperparts with reddish uppertail coverts. The next-to-inner tail feathers are longer than the others and all have white tips. Their underparts are cinnamon red. The face has a black "mask" with a white supercilium and gular stripe. The sexes are similar but the female has shorter wings and a less strongly decurved bill.

Distribution and habitat

Major taxonomic systems place the planalto hermit in a wide swath of Brazil south of the Amazon rainforest, eastern Bolivia, northern Argentina and much of Paraguay. The South American Classification Committee (SACC) of the American Ornithological Society places the species in those four countries and also notes many records in Peru. It inhabits a variety of landscapes including non-forested but "vegetation-rich" areas, dry forest, secondary forest, and gallery forest. It is also found in human-modified environments as long as trees and herbs are present.

Behavior

Movement

The planalto hermit is thought to be partly migratory in some parts of its range but definitive data are not available.

Feeding

The planalto hermit is probably a "trap-line" feeder like other hermit hummingbirds, visiting a circuit of flowering plants for nectar. It also consumes small arthropods.

Breeding

The planalto hermit's nesting season is not fully defined but appears to span from August to April. Its nest is a long cone-shaped cup made of plant material and spider web. In contrast to most other Phaethornis hermits, it hangs the nest from a vertical branch, in a cavity of a rock face, and also in or under human structures like culverts, bridges, and abandoned buildings. The clutch size is two eggs.

Vocalization

The planalto hermit's song is variable, "often a sequence of evenly-spaced, alternating, single and double notes, e.g. 'ti-tsi...tsi...tsi...tsi...ti-tsi...tsi..tsi', but also sometimes triple-noted phrases such as 'chu-tsi-tsi...chu-tsi-tsi...chu-tsi-tsi...'."

Status

The IUCN has assessed the planalto hermit as being of Least Concern. Though its population size and trend are unknown, it is common throughout its large range, occurs in several protected areas, and is well adapted to human-made environments such as gardens and city parks.

References

External links

Stamps (for Brazil) (incorrect RangeMap)
Planalto Hermit photo gallery VIREO 

planalto hermit
Birds of the Caatinga
Birds of the Cerrado
Birds of the Pantanal
Birds of Brazil
Birds of Bolivia
Birds of Paraguay
Hummingbird species of South America
planalto hermit
Taxonomy articles created by Polbot